One Man's Journey is a 1933 American pre-Code drama film starring Lionel Barrymore as Dr. Eli Watt. The picture was based on the short story Failure written by Katharine Haviland-Taylor. It was remade by RKO as A Man to Remember (1938). The story tells of a small-town doctor working under difficult circumstances in a rural area somewhere in the United States.

Plot

Cast

Reception
The film was popular at the box office.

Preservation status
In April 2007, Turner Classic Movies (TCM) premiered six films produced by Merian C. Cooper at RKO which had been out of distribution for more than 50 years. (A retired RKO executive stated in an interview used as a promo on TCM for the premiere that Cooper did allow the films to be shown in 1955–1956 in a limited re-release and only in New York City.)

According to TCM host Robert Osborne, Cooper agreed to a legal settlement in 1946, after accusing RKO of not giving him all the money due him from his producer's contract in the 1930s. The settlement gave Cooper complete ownership of six titles:

Rafter Romance (1933),
Double Harness (1933),
The Right to Romance (1933),
One Man's Journey (1933), Stingaree (1934),
Living on Love (1937), and
A Man to Remember (1938).
When Turner Broadcasting bought the RKO film library in 1987, the six films were not included[4] and the rights had to be purchased separately. The film's remake, A Man To Remember, was unable to be found. The original copies of the film's negative were destroyed due to negligence and the film was thought to have been lost forever. However, a 35mm, original nitrate print with Dutch subtitles was discovered in the Netherlands. It is the only known surviving copy and was restored by TCM.

In 2000, A Man to Remember was preserved by the Netherlands Film Museum.

References

External links
 
 
 
 

1933 films
American black-and-white films
1933 drama films
1930s English-language films
Films based on American novels
Films directed by John S. Robertson
American drama films
RKO Pictures films
1930s American films
English-language drama films